Kurtatsch an der Weinstraße, often abbreviated to Kurtatsch or Cortaccia, is a comune (municipality) in South Tyrol in northern Italy, located about  southwest of the city of Bolzano.

Kurtatsch borders the following municipalities: Neumarkt, Margreid, Tramin, Coredo, Roverè della Luna, Ton, Tres, and Vervò.

Coat-of-arms
The emblem shows an or postillion hornet with tassels on azure background; at the corners are placed four six-pointed or stars. The postillon’s hornet indicates that the village was a postal station; the star represent the four villages in the municipality. The emblem was adopted in 1967.

Historic sights 
 Schloss Nussegg
 Ansitz Freienfeld
 Ansitz Strehlburg
 Ansitz Nussdorf
 Ansitz Fohrhof
 Ansitz Eberlehof
 Ansitz Baron von Widmann
 Finkenhof House

Linguistic distribution
According to the 2011 census, 96.25% of the population speak German, 3.36% Italian and 0.38% Ladin as first language.

References

External links 

  

Municipalities of South Tyrol
Nonsberg Group